Mustapha Faysal El Idrissi (born 16 November 1977) is a former professional footballer who played as a midfielder. Born in France, he represented Morocco at international level.

Career 
El Idrissi signed for Coventry City at the start of the 2006–07 season on a trial basis, but he was not signed to a permanent deal despite featuring in the first team. El Idrissi also had a trial at Bristol City, but was not offered a contract.

On 15 January 2008, he signed a contract with FC Luzern after one year away from football. On 1 September 2008, he moved to R.F.C. Tournai.

References

External links

1977 births
Living people
French sportspeople of Moroccan descent
French footballers
Moroccan footballers
Association football midfielders
Footballers from Lille
Morocco international footballers
Lille OSC players
Royal Excel Mouscron players
FC Groningen players
1. FC Saarbrücken players
Coventry City F.C. players
FC Luzern players
C.D. Santa Clara players
SV Elversberg players
Fujairah FC players
Belgian Pro League players
Eredivisie players
Swiss Super League players
2. Bundesliga players
UAE First Division League players
Expatriate footballers in Belgium
Expatriate footballers in the Netherlands
Expatriate footballers in Germany
Expatriate footballers in Switzerland
Expatriate footballers in the United Arab Emirates
Expatriate footballers in Portugal
Expatriate footballers in England
Moroccan expatriate sportspeople in Germany
Moroccan expatriate sportspeople in Belgium
Moroccan expatriate sportspeople in England
Moroccan expatriate sportspeople in Switzerland
Moroccan expatriate sportspeople in the United Arab Emirates
Moroccan expatriate sportspeople in Portugal
Moroccan expatriate sportspeople in the Netherlands
French expatriate sportspeople in Germany
French expatriate sportspeople in Belgium
French expatriate sportspeople in England
French expatriate sportspeople in Switzerland
French expatriate sportspeople in the United Arab Emirates
French expatriate sportspeople in Portugal
French expatriate sportspeople in the Netherlands